Caerphilly Mountain lies between Cardiff and Caerphilly at the southern edge of the South Wales Coalfield.

Since 1957 there had been a small wooden snack bar near to the summit. In September 2011 this was replaced by an eco-friendly permanent building, with under floor heating, solar panels and rainwater-flushed toilets, at a cost of £300,000. The mountain includes Caerphilly Common.

The climb features regularly on the Tour of Britain cycle race, with double climbs in the 2012 and 2013 races.

References

Caerphilly
Mountains and hills of Caerphilly County Borough
Common land in Wales
Climbs in cycle racing in the United Kingdom